The 1924 Brunswick state election was held on 7 December 1924 to elect the 48 members of the Landtag of the Free State of Brunswick.

Results

References 

Brunswick
Elections in Lower Saxony